Glucose transporter type 4 (GLUT4), also known as solute carrier family 2, facilitated glucose transporter member 4, is a protein encoded, in humans, by the SLC2A4 gene. GLUT4 is the insulin-regulated glucose transporter found primarily in adipose tissues and striated muscle (skeletal and cardiac). The first evidence for this distinct glucose transport protein was provided by David James in 1988. The gene that encodes GLUT4 was cloned and mapped in 1989.

At the cell surface, GLUT4 permits the facilitated diffusion of circulating glucose down its concentration gradient into muscle and fat cells.  Once within cells, glucose is rapidly phosphorylated by glucokinase in the liver and hexokinase in other tissues to form glucose-6-phosphate, which then enters glycolysis or is polymerized into glycogen.  Glucose-6-phosphate cannot diffuse back out of cells, which also serves to maintain the concentration gradient for glucose to passively enter cells.

Structure 

Like all proteins, the unique amino acid arrangement in the primary sequence of GLUT4 is what allows it to transport glucose across the plasma membrane. In addition to the phenylalanine on the N-terminus, two Leucine residues and acidic motifs on the COOH-terminus are believed to play a key role in the kinetics of endocytosis and exocytosis.

Other GLUT proteins 
There are 14 total GLUT proteins separated into 3 classes based on sequence similarities. Class 1 consists of GLUT 1-4 and 14, class 2 contains GLUT  5, 7, 9 and 11, and class 3 has GLUT 6, 8, 10, 12 and 13.

Although there are some sequence differences between all GLUT proteins, they all have some basic structural components. For example, both the N and C termini in GLUT proteins are exposed to the cytoplasm of the cell, and they all have 12 transmembrane segments.

Tissue distribution

Skeletal muscle 

In striated skeletal muscle cells, GLUT4 concentration in the plasma membrane can increase as a result of either exercise or muscle contraction.

During exercise, the body needs to convert glucose to ATP to be used as energy. As G-6-P concentrations decrease, hexokinase becomes less inhibited, and the glycolytic and oxidative pathways that make ATP are able to proceed. This also means that muscle cells are able to take in more glucose as its intracellular concentrations decrease. In order to increase glucose levels in the cell, GLUT4 is the primary transporter used in this facilitated diffusion.

Although muscle contractions function in a similar way and also induce the translocation of GLUT4 into the plasma membrane, the two skeletal muscle processes obtain different forms of intracellular GLUT4. The GLUT4 carrier vesicles are either transferrin positive or negative, and are recruited by different stimuli. Transferrin-positive GLUT4 vesicles are utilized during muscle contraction while the transferrin-negative vesicles are activated by insulin stimulation as well as by exercise.

Cardiac muscle 
Cardiac muscle is slightly different from skeletal muscle. At rest, they prefer to utilize fatty acids as their main energy source. As activity increases and it begins to pump faster, the cardiac muscles begin to oxidize glucose at a higher rate.

 An analysis of mRNA levels of GLUT1 and GLUT4 in cardiac muscles show that GLUT1 plays a larger role in cardiac muscles than it does in skeletal muscles. GLUT4, however, is still believed to be the primary transporter for glucose.

Much like in other tissues, GLUT4 also responds to insulin signaling, and is transported into the plasma membrane to facilitate the diffusion of glucose into the cell.

Adipose tissue 
Adipose tissue, commonly known as fat, is a depository for energy in order to conserve metabolic homeostasis. As the body takes in energy in the form of glucose, some is expended, and the rest is stored as glycogen (primarily in the liver, muscle cells), or as triglyceride in adipose tissue.

An imbalance in glucose intake and energy expenditure has been shown to lead to both adipose cell hypertrophy and hyperplasia, which lead to obesity. In addition, mutations in GLUT4 genes in adipocytes can also lead to increased GLUT4 expression in adipose cells, which allows for increased glucose uptake and therefore more fat stored. If GLUT4 is over-expressed, it can actually alter nutrient distribution and send excess glucose into adipose tissue, leading to increased adipose tissue mass.

Regulation

Insulin
Insulin is released from the pancreas and into the bloodstream in response to increased glucose concentration in the blood. Insulin is stored in beta cells in the pancreas. When glucose in the blood binds to glucose receptors on the beta cell membrane, a signal cascade is initiated inside the cell that results in insulin stored in vesicles in these cells being released into the blood stream. Increased insulin levels cause the uptake of glucose into the cells. GLUT4 is stored in the cell in transport vesicles, and is quickly incorporated into the plasma membrane of the cell when insulin binds to membrane receptors.

Under conditions of low insulin, most GLUT4 is sequestered in intracellular vesicles in muscle and fat cells. As the vesicles fuse with the plasma membrane, GLUT4 transporters are inserted and become available for transporting glucose, and glucose absorption increases.
The genetically engineered muscle insulin receptor knock‐out (MIRKO) mouse was designed to be insensitive to glucose uptake caused by insulin, meaning that GLUT4 is absent. Mice with diabetes or fasting hyperglycemia, however, were found to be immune to the negative effects of the insensitivity.

The mechanism for GLUT4 is an example of a cascade effect, where binding of a ligand to a membrane receptor amplifies the signal and causes a cellular response. In this case, insulin binds to the insulin receptor in its dimeric form and activates the receptor's tyrosine-kinase domain. The receptor then recruits Insulin Receptor Substrate, or IRS-1, which binds the enzyme PI-3 kinase. PI-3 kinase converts the membrane lipid PIP2 to PIP3.  PIP3 is specifically recognized by PKB (protein kinase B) and by PDK1, which can phosphorylate and activate PKB. Once phosphorylated, PKB is in its active form and phosphorylates TBC1D4, which inhibits the GTPase-activating domain associated with TBC1D4, allowing for Rab protein to change from its GDP to GTP bound state. Inhibition of the GTPase-activating domain leaves proteins next in the cascade in their active form, and stimulates GLUT4 to be expressed on the plasma membrane.

RAC1 is a GTPase also activated by insulin. Rac1 stimulates reorganization of the cortical Actin cytoskeleton which allows for the GLUT4 vesicles to be inserted into the plasma membrane. A RAC1 Knockout mouse has reduced glucose uptake in muscle tissue.

Knockout mice that are heterozygous for GLUT4 develop insulin resistance in their muscles as well as diabetes.

Muscle contraction
Muscle contraction stimulates muscle cells to translocate GLUT4 receptors to their surfaces. This is especially true in cardiac muscle, where continuous contraction increases the rate of GLUT4 translocation; but is observed to a lesser extent in increased skeletal muscle contraction. In skeletal muscle, muscle contractions increase GLUT4 translocation several fold, and this is likely regulated by RAC1 and AMP-activated protein kinase.

Muscle stretching
Muscle stretching also stimulates GLUT4 translocation and glucose uptake in rodent muscle via RAC1.

Interactions 

GLUT4 has been shown to interact with death-associated protein 6, also known as Daxx. Daxx, which is used to regulate apoptosis, has been shown to associate with GLUT4 in the cytoplasm. UBX-domains, such as the one found in GLUT4, have been shown to associate with apoptotic signaling. So this interaction aids in the translocation of Daxx within the cell.

In addition, recent reports demonstrated the presence of GLUT4 gene in central nervous system such as the hippocampus. Moreover, impairment in insulin-stimulated trafficking of GLUT4 in the hippocampus result in decreased metabolic activities and plasticity of hippocampal neurons, which leads to depressive like behaviour and cognitive dysfunction.

Interactive pathway map

References

External links 
 
 ''USCD—Nature molecule pages: The signaling pathway", "GLUT4"; contains a high-resolution network map. Accessed 25 December 2009.

Solute carrier family